Facebook Reels or Reels on Facebook is a short-form video-sharing platform complete with music, audio and artificial effects, offered by Facebook, an online social networking service owned by American company Meta Platforms. Similar to Facebook's main service, the platform hosts user-generated content, but it only allows for pieces to be 60 seconds long and have a 9:16 aspect ratio.

History 
In March 2021, Facebook started experimenting with showing vertical videos up to 30 seconds for US and India users. Facebook Reels was originally released in United States in September 2021, following India's TikTok ban. Later on Facebook Reels was globally released in February 2022, after releases in 150 countries.

Bonus 

Facebook launched the Reels Play Bonus program as "Challenges" program on Facebook in October 2021 as a way to reward outstanding Reels creators. Facebook stated that there will be "a $1B bonus dispersed over the course of 2021–2022" and described it as a method to "monetize and compensate creators for their content." The Reels Play Bonus program initially was the creators of United States, Canada and Mexico. Later Facebook expanded their Reels Play Bonus program to more countries for select group of people and the program is invite-only.

Requirements 
According to Meta, Facebook has introduced a new way to let creators participating in the Reels Play Bonus program, earn up to $4,000 per month. Meta clarifies:

 Each month, creators can take part in a number of consecutive, cumulative challenges. Earn $20 once each of your five reels has received 100 plays.
 A creator can unlock a new challenge once they complete the current one. As a result, after finishing the previous example, they would receive a new one that read: Receive $100 when 20 of your Reels accumulate 500 plays each.
 At the beginning of each 30-day bonus period, Challenge progress will be reset to #1.

Monetization 
Facebook began testing an ad monetization platform for Reels content in February 2022, giving users another way to make money off of their work. Facebook said that Reels monetization would be implemented gradually. By the middle of March, practically all the countries that currently have an in-stream ads monetization program will be able to access overlay advertisements on Facebook Reels. The overlay ads will be available in two formats that are Banner ads and Sticker ads.

See also 
Facebook Watch

References

External links 
 Facebook Reels creator page

Facebook
Internet properties established in 2021
2021 in Internet culture